Nauvoo may refer to:

Places
Nauvoo, Alabama, town in Walker and Winston Counties
Nauvoo, Illinois, city in Hancock County
Nauvoo, Tioga County, Pennsylvania, unincorporated community
Nauvoo, York County, Pennsylvania, unincorporated community
Nauvoo, Tennessee, unincorporated community in Dyer County

See also
 Nauvoo House, boarding house of Joseph Smith in Nauvoo, Illinois
 Nauvoo Temple, temple constructed by the Church of Jesus Christ of Latter Day Saints in Nauvoo, Illinois